Peace of Mind may refer to:

 Inner peace, a deliberate state of psychological or spiritual calm despite the potential presence of stressors

Music

Performers
 Peace of Mind (band), an American nu metal band
 Slipping Stitches, previously Peace of Mind, a Finnish rock band

Albums
 Peace of Mind (Breathe album), 1990
 Peace of Mind (Michael Monroe album), 1996
 Peace of Mind (Rebelution album), 2012
 Peace of Mind (Jay Whiss album), 2020

Songs
 "Peace of Mind" (1960 song), by Teresa Brewer
 "Peace of Mind" (Bee Gees song), 1964
 "Peace of Mind" (Boston song), 1976
 "Peace of Mind/The Candle Burns", by Walton Jones and David Hunter (falsely attributed to the Beatles), 1973
 "Peace of Mind", by Avicii from Tim, 2019
 "Peace of Mind", by Bad Company from Burnin' Sky, 1977
 "Peace of Mind", by Bat for Lashes from Two Suns, 2009
 "Peace of Mind", by Black Sabbath from 13, 2013
 "Peace of Mind", by Blue Cheer on the album New! Improved!, 1969
 "Peace of Mind", by Eddy Raven from Eyes, 1980
 "Peace of Mind", by Gotthard on the album Open, 1998
 "Peace of Mind", by The Grapes of Wrath from Treehouse, 1987
 "Peace of Mind", by Imagine Dragons from Mercury – Acts 1 & 2, 2022
 "Peace of Mind", by John Mayer on the album Heavier Things, 2003
 "Peace of Mind", by The Killers from the 10th anniversary edition of Sam's Town, 2016
 "Peace of Mind", by Kottonmouth Kings from Kottonmouth Kings, 2005
 "Peace of Mind", by Little Dragon, 2019
 "Peace of Mind", by Neil Young from Comes a Time, 1978
 "Peace of Mind", by Rare Bird, 1974
 "Peace of Mind", by Slowthai from Nothing Great About Britain, 2019
 "Peace of Mind", by Talib Kweli, 2004
 "Peace of Mind", by Tyler Childers from Country Squire, 2019
 "Peace of Mind", by Will Dailey, 2007
 "Peace of Mind (Song for Sarah)", by Axium from Matter of Time, 2002

Other media
 Peace of Mind (film), a 1931 German film
 "Peace of Mind" (Justified), a 2013 episode of the TV series Justified
 Peace of Mind, a 1946 book by Joshua L. Liebman

See also
 Piece of Mind (disambiguation)